The Nectarian Period of the lunar geologic timescale runs from 3920 million years ago to 3850 million years ago. It is the period during which the Nectaris Basin and other major basins were formed by large impact events. Ejecta from Nectaris form the upper part of the densely cratered terrain found in lunar highlands.

Relationship to Earth's geologic time scale
Since little or no geological evidence on Earth exists from the time spanned by the Nectarian period of the Moon, the Nectarian has been used by at least one notable scientific work as an unofficial subdivision of the terrestrial Hadean eon.

See also

References

 
03
Lunar geologic periods